Egglesburn is a village in County Durham, in England. It is situated in Teesdale, on the other side of the River Tees from Mickleton.

In the 1960s Durham County Council bought a former sand and gravel quarry which they turned into a wild life reserve. It is now the woodland known as Egglesburn Wood and open as a public recreation area.

References

Villages in County Durham